Advenella incenata is a Gram-negative, oxidase- and catalase-positive, rod-shaped bacterium from the genus Advenella. Colonies of A. incenata are light brown in color.

References

External links
Type strain of Advenella incenata at BacDive -  the Bacterial Diversity Metadatabase

Burkholderiales
Bacteria described in 2005